Several Arrows Later is the sixth album from Matt Pond PA, released in 2005.

Track listing
 "Halloween" – 5:02
 "So Much Trouble" – 3:58
 "The Trees and the Wild" – 2:48
 "Several Arrows Later" – 3:34
 "It Is Safe" – 4:58
 "Emblems" – 3:12
 "City Song" – 4:12
 "From Debris" – 4:31
 "Brooklyn Stars" – 3:49
 "The Moviegoer" – 3:12
 "Spring Provides" – 3:21
 "Devil in the Water" – 5:27

2005 albums
Matt Pond PA albums